Zheng Saisai was the defending champion, but she lost to An-Sophie Mestach in the quarterfinals.

Ons Jabeur won the title, defeating Mestach in the final, 6–0, 6–2.

Seeds

Main draw

Finals

Top half

Bottom half

References 
 Main draw

Kurume Best Amenity Cup - Singles
Kurume Best Amenity Cup